Turneria pacifica is a species of ant in the genus Turneria. Described by William M. Mann in 1919, the species is endemic to the Solomon Islands and Vanuatu.

References

External links

Dolichoderinae
Insects described in 1919